Sir Hugh Smith, 1st Baronet (21 April 1632 – 26 July 1680) was an English politician who sat in the House of Commons  in 1660 and 1679.

Smith was the son of Thomas Smith of Long Ashton, Somerset and his wife Florence Poulett, daughter of John Poulett, 1st Baron Poulett of Hinton St George, Somerset.

In 1660, Smith was elected Member of Parliament for Somerset in the Convention Parliament. He was created baronet  of Ashton Court on 16 May 1661 following the English Restoration, in recognition of the family's loyalty to the Crown.  He was appointed High Sheriff of Somerset for 1665–1666 and re-elected MP for Somerset in 1679.

Smith died at the age of 48. He had married Elizabeth Ashburnham, daughter of John Ashburnham of Ashburnham and was succeeded by his son John.

References

 

1632 births
1680 deaths
People from North Somerset (district)
Baronets in the Baronetage of England
High Sheriffs of Somerset
English MPs 1660
English MPs 1679